White myrtle is a common name for several trees and  may refer to:

Auranticarpa rhombifolia, native to eastern Australia
Hypocalymma angustifolium, native to western Australia